4AD is a compilation EP released by the British band Bauhaus. It was released in October 1983 by 4AD and comprises three singles and three B-sides from those singles.

Track listing

Personnel
David J – bass, backing vocals, cover design
Kevin Haskins – drums, percussion
Daniel Ash – guitar, backing vocals
Peter Murphy – lead vocals
Bauhaus – producer
Emmanuel Sougez – photographer (front cover)
Stella Watts – photographer (back cover)

References

External links 

 

1983 EPs
Bauhaus (band) compilation albums
1983 compilation albums
4AD EPs